Alan Watt may refer to:

 Alan Watt (diplomat) (1901–1988), Australian diplomat
 Alan Watt (cricketer) (1907–1974), English cricketer
 Alan Watt (rugby union) (born 1967), Scotland rugby union player
 Allan Watt (1922–2014), Scottish sprinter

See also
 Alan Watts (1915–1973), British philosopher